Saitovo (Säyet) is a rural locality (a village) in Gorkovsky Selsoviet, Kushnarenkovsky District, Bashkortostan, Russia. The population was 257 as of 2010. There are 2 streets.

Geography 
Saitovo is located 34 km northwest of Kushnarenkovo (the district's administrative centre) by road. Mars is the nearest rural locality.

References 

Rural localities in Kushnarenkovsky District